Dead meat or Deadmeat can refer to:
 Dead Meat (film), Irish Zombie film
 Dead Meat: 10 Years of Blood, Feathers & Lipstick, a punk album
 Deadmeat (film), British thriller film
 Deadmeat Disciples, a metal album